Archilobesia doboszi is a species of moth of the family Tortricidae. It is found in New Caledonia in the southwest Pacific Ocean. The habitat consists of rainforests.

The wingspan is about 18 mm. The ground colour of the forewings is cream, suffused and sprinkled with brown. The costal strigulae (fine streaks) are cream in the basal half of the wing and white in the distal half. The hindwings are brown.

Etymology
The species is named for Dr Ronald Dobosz, who collected the species.

References

Moths described in 2013
Olethreutini
Moths of Oceania